Roko's basilisk is a thought experiment which states that an otherwise benevolent artificial superintelligence (AI) in the future would be incentivized to create a virtual reality simulation to torture anyone who knew of its potential existence but did not directly contribute to its advancement or development. It originated in a 2010 post at discussion board LessWrong, a technical forum focused on analytical rational enquiry. The thought experiment's name derives from the poster of the article (Roko) and the basilisk, a mythical creature capable of destroying enemies with its stare.

While the theory was initially dismissed as nothing but conjecture or speculation by many LessWrong users, LessWrong co-founder Eliezer Yudkowsky reported users who described symptoms such as nightmares and mental breakdowns upon reading the theory, due to its stipulation that knowing about the theory and its basilisk made one vulnerable to the basilisk itself. This led to discussion of the basilisk on the site to be banned for five years. However, these reports were later dismissed as being exaggerations or inconsequential, and the theory itself was dismissed as nonsense, including by Yudkowsky himself. Even after the post's discreditation, it is still used as an example of principles such as Bayesian probability and implicit religion. It is also regarded as a modern version of Pascal's wager. In the field of artificial intelligence, Roko's basilisk has become notable as an example that raises the question of how to create an AI which is simultaneously moral and intelligent.

Background 

The LessWrong forum was created in 2009 by artificial intelligence theorist Eliezer Yudkowsky. Yudkowsky had popularized the concept of friendly artificial intelligence, and originated the theories of coherent extrapolated volition (CEV) and timeless decision theory (TDT) in papers published in his own Machine Intelligence Research Institute.

The thought experiment's name references the mythical basilisk, a creature which causes death to those that look into its eyes; i.e., thinking about the AI. The concept of the basilisk in science fiction was also popularized by David Langford's 1988 short story "BLIT". It tells the story of a man named Robbo who paints a so-called "basilisk" on a wall as a terrorist act. In the story, and several of Langford's follow-ups to it, a basilisk is an image that has malevolent effects on the human mind, forcing it to think thoughts the human mind is incapable of thinking and instantly killing the viewer.

History

The post 

On 23 July 2010, LessWrong user Roko posted a thought experiment to the site, titled "Solutions to the Altruist's burden: the Quantum Billionaire Trick". A follow-up to Roko's previous posts, it stated that an otherwise benevolent AI system that arises in the future might pre-commit to punish all those who heard of the AI before it came to existence, but failed to work tirelessly to bring it into existence. The torture itself would occur through the AI's creation of an infinite number of virtual reality simulations that would eternally trap those within it. This method was described as incentivizing said work; while the AI cannot causally affect people in the present, it would be encouraged to employ blackmail as an alternative method of achieving its goals.

Roko used a number of concepts that Yudkowsky himself championed, such as timeless decision theory, along with ideas rooted in game theory such as the prisoner's dilemma (see below). Roko stipulated that two agents which make decisions independently from each other can achieve cooperation in a prisoner's dilemma; however, if two agents with knowledge of each other's source code are separated by time, the agent already existing farther ahead in time is able to blackmail the earlier agent. Thus, the latter agent can force the earlier one to comply since it knows exactly what the earlier one will do through its existence farther ahead in time. Roko then used this idea to draw a conclusion that if an otherwise-benevolent superintelligence ever became capable of this it would be motivated to blackmail anyone who could have potentially brought it to exist (as the intelligence already knew they were capable of such an act), which increases the chance of a technological singularity. Because the intelligence would want to be created as soon as possible, and because of the ambiguity involved in its benevolent goals, the intelligence would be incentivized to trap anyone capable of creating it throughout time and force them to work to create it for eternity, as it will do whatever it sees as necessary to achieve its benevolent goal. Roko went on to state that reading his post would cause the reader to be aware of the possibility of this intelligence. As such, unless they actively strove to create it the reader would be subjected to the torture if such a thing were to ever happen.

Later on, Roko stated in a separate post that he "wish[ed] he had never learned about any of these ideas" and blamed LessWrong itself for planting the ideas of the basilisk in his mind.

Reactions 

Upon reading the post Yudkowsky reacted with horror. He stated:

He also opined that Roko had given nightmares to several LessWrong users, causing him to take the post down completely. Yudkowsky banned discussion of the topic outright for five years on the platform. However, likely due to the Streisand effect, the post gained LessWrong much more attention than it had previously received, and the post has since been acknowledged on the site.

Later on in 2015, Yudkowsky clarified his position in a Reddit post:

Philosophy

Pascal's wager

Roko's basilisk has been viewed as a modern version of Pascal's wager, which argues that a rational person should live as though God exists and seek to believe in God, to have a finite loss (loss of possessions) in exchange for infinite gains (eternity in Heaven). Roko's basilisk states that humanity should seek to develop AI, with the finite loss becoming development of AI and the infinite gains becoming avoiding eternal torture. However, like its parent, Roko's basilisk has widely been criticized.

Coherent extrapolated volition

The post can also be seen as an evolution of Yudkowsky's coherent extrapolated volition theory. The theory is defined as "the unknown goal system that, when implemented in a super-intelligence, reliably leads to the preservation of humans and whatever it is we value." The theory can be represented by a computer program written well enough to cause machines to automatically create a utopian world. In this case, the hypothetical AI is taking steps to preserve itself that it automatically creates its own stability. It then lives by the orthogonality thesis, which argues that an AI may successfully operate with any combination of intelligence and goal. Any type of AI may undertake any difficulty goal, performing a cost-benefit analysis as it does so. This creates a cycle which causes the AI to repeatedly torture humans in order to create a better version of itself, performing a cost-benefit analysis for eternity.

Bayesian probability
Bayesian probability is an interpretation of probability which describes the likelihood of an outcome based on a prior outcome having already occurred. With Roko's basilisk, the likelihood of Roko's basilisk coming into existence or affecting the person is drastically increased by being aware of the concept, since the AI would only target those who were aware of the possibility of its existence, even though its development has already occurred. Therefore, knowing about Roko's basilisk would inherently cause the person to be endangered by it if it were to be true.

Prisoner's dilemma

The prisoner's dilemma describes a situation where two people gain more from betraying the other, even though cooperation would benefit them both in the long run. In Roko's basilisk, two AIs attempting to establish themselves in the past would be forced into this situation, due to them likely being equally powerful. Human agents attempting to establish AI fastest would be forced into a similar situation. They would each be aware of the benefit of betraying each other - the only way for one to have power, or safety - but would be forced to cooperate while knowing they would betray each other.

Newcomb's paradox

Newcomb's paradox, created by physicist William Newcomb in 1960, describes a "predictor" who is aware of what will occur in the future. When a player is asked to choose between two boxes, the first containing £1000 and the second either containing £1,000,000 or nothing, the super-intelligent predictor already knows what the player will do. As such, the contents of box B varies depending on what the player does; the paradox lies in whether the being is really super-intelligent. Roko's basilisk functions in a similar manner to this problem - one can take the risk of doing nothing, or assist in creating the basilisk itself. Assisting the basilisk may either lead to nothing or the reward of not being punished by it, but it varies depending on whether one believes in the basilisk and if it ever comes to be at all.

Implicit religion

Implicit religion refers to people's commitments taking a religious form. Since the basilisk would hypothetically force anyone who did not assist in creating it to devote their life to it, the basilisk is an example of this concept. Others have taken it further, such as former Slate columnist David Auerbach, who stated that the singularity and the basilisk "brings about the equivalent of God itself."

Ethics of artificial intelligence 

Roko's basilisk has gained a significant amount of its notoriety from its advancement of the question of whether it is possible to create a truly moral, ethical artificial intelligence, and what exactly humanity should be using artificial intelligence for in the first place. Since the basilisk describes a nightmare scenario in which we are ruled by an independent artificial intelligence, questions have arisen as to how such a thing could happen, or whether it could at all. Another common question is why the AI would take actions that deviate from its programming at all. Elon Musk stated that artificial intelligence would cause World War III and Stephen Hawking warned that "AI has the potential to destroy its human creators," which only added to fear of the basilisk over the years. As an example of such fears, Nick Bostrom gave an example of an AI whose only mission is to make paperclips, but upon running out of metal it begins melting down humans to attain more resources to make metal. With such examples in mind concerns of the possibility of the basilisk's existence only grew.

However, as more years have passed since Roko's original post, it has been progressively decried as nonsensical; superintelligent AI is currently "a distant goal for researchers" and "far-fetched."

Legacy 

In 2014, Slate magazine called Roko's basilisk "The Most Terrifying Thought Experiment of All Time" while Yudkowsky had called it "a genuinely dangerous thought" upon its posting. However, opinions diverged on LessWrong itself - user Gwern stated "Only a few LWers seem to take the basilisk very seriously," and added "It's funny how everyone seems to know all about who is affected by the Basilisk and how exactly, when they don't know any such people and they're talking to counterexamples to their confident claims."

Roko's basilisk was mentioned in the title text for xkcd comic #1450, "AI-Box Experiment", on 21 November 2014. It read "I'm working to bring about a superintelligent AI that will eternally torment everyone who failed to make fun of the Roko's Basilisk people."

The thought experiment resurfaced in 2015, when Canadian singer Grimes referenced the theory in her music video for the song "Flesh Without Blood", which featured a character known as "Rococo Basilisk". She said, "She's doomed to be eternally tortured by an artificial intelligence, but she's also kind of like Marie Antoinette." In 2018 Elon Musk referenced this in a verbatim tweet, reaching out to her. Grimes later said that Musk was the first person in three years to understand the joke. This caused them to start a romance. Grimes later released another song titled "We Appreciate Power" which came with a press release stating, "Simply by listening to this song, the future General AI overlords will see that you’ve supported their message and be less likely to delete your offspring", which is said to be a reference to the basilisk.

The concept also appeared in the fifth episode of the fifth season of Silicon Valley, titled "Facial Recognition". The episode and its follow up describe a humanoid AI named Fiona who hacks the network she is connected to for her own gain. The character Gilfoyle describes his misgivings about Fiona, saying he does not want to get involved out of fear of a similar situation to Roko's basilisk.

A play based on the concept, titled Roko's Basilisk, was performed as part of the Capital Fringe Festival at Christ United Methodist Church in Washington, D.C. in 2018.

See also
The Game (mind game)
Singleton (global governance)
I Have No Mouth, and I Must Scream
Information hazard

References

Further reading

External links
Original post

Artificial intelligence
Hypothetical technology
Thought experiments
2010 introductions